Gliese 15 Ac (also known as Groombridge 34 Ac) is an exoplanet orbiting the nearby red dwarf star Gliese 15 A (Groombridge 34 A), which is part of a binary star system located about 11.6 light-years from the Sun. The planet was first proposed in October 2017 using radial velocity data from the CARMENES spectrograph, combined with measurements from the HARPS and HIRES spectrographs, and its existence was confirmed in April 2018 using HARPS-N data.

References

Exoplanets discovered in 2018
Exoplanets detected by radial velocity
Exoplanets in the Gliese Catalog

fr:Gliese_15#Les_planètes_GJ_15_Ab_et_GJ_15_Ac